Street Flow is a French drama film directed by Leïla Sy and Kery James and written by Kery James. The plot revolves around fifteen-year-old Noumouké from the suburb of Paris who is about to decide which brother's foot steps to follow - the lawyer student Soulaymaan or the gangster Demba.

The film was released on October 12, 2019 on Netflix.

Cast
 Jammeh Diangana
 Bakary Diombera
 Kery James
 Pierre Rousselet

Release
Street Flow was released on October 12, 2019 on Netflix. According to Netflix, over 2.6 million accounts watched Street Flow within the first week of release.

References

External links
 
 

2010s French-language films
2019 drama films
2019 films
French drama films
French-language Netflix original films
Hood films
2010s American films
2010s French films